James Hoyes Panton III (February 22, 1914 – January 14, 2008) was a Canadian athlete of the 1930s.

Panton was born in North Battleford, Saskatchewan and attended the University of Washington. He was the Pacific Coast Conference North Division long jump champion in 1938, beating a field which included Olympic medalist Mack Robinson. His jump of 24 feet and 2.7 inches remained a conference record for nearly two decades.

At the 1938 British Empire Games in Sydney, Panton finished with a silver medal in the long jump. He had sat in the gold medal position by setting a British Empire Games record, but the mark was bettered 15 minutes later by countryman Harold Brown. In addition to long jump, he also placed seventh in the triple jump and tenth in the high jump.

Panton's career was interrupted by World War II, during which time he served in the Air Force. He retired from athletics after the war. Later in life he competed in masters swimming and won gold at the World Senior Games.

See also
List of Commonwealth Games medallists in athletics (men)

References

1914 births
2008 deaths
Canadian male long jumpers
Canadian male triple jumpers
Canadian male high jumpers
Washington Huskies men's track and field athletes
Sportspeople from North Battleford
Commonwealth Games silver medallists for Canada
Commonwealth Games medallists in athletics
Medallists at the 1938 British Empire Games
Athletes (track and field) at the 1938 British Empire Games